Moesha Buduong is a Ghanaian TV presenter, actress and model who is also known for granting a controversial interview to CNN reporter Christiane Amanpour on issues of sex, love and gender.

Controversy 
In April 2018, Buduong came under criticism from Ghanaians. over a controversial interview she gave to CNN reporter Christiane Amanpour. In the interview, Buduong mentioned that Ghanaian women use men as their primary source of income, since the economy is tough. They do this through engaging in sexual intercourse with the men. She is quoted as saying that "In Ghana, our economy is such a way that you need someone to take care of you. You can’t make enough money as a woman here. Because even when you want to get an apartment, in Ghana they take two years’ advance and I just started working where will I get money to pay?" Her comments received harsh criticism from both men and women who felt she was painting a negative picture of Ghanaian (and by extension African) women. Celebrities such as John Dumelo, Lydia Forson, Eazzy, DKB and Afia Odo shared their views on Twitter, most of them negative.

Other people also felt the criticism was unwarranted, because the comments made were a reflection of the reality of Ghanaian life. Radio host Captain Smart commended her and entreated Ghanaians to applaud her for speaking the truth.

Christine Amanpour herself has pleaded with the public not to shame Buduong, calling on the President, Nana Akufo-Addo and Gender Minister Otiko Afisa Djaba to support her. Amanpour said, "I want people to recognize Moesha's right to speak up and the courage she showed by sharing such intimate details about her personal life. As a woman and a journalist, I'm hurt and angry to see such an innocent woman condemned by the press and by many people on social media in this way. It's to the point that Moesha is not sure she can return to Ghana safely. I am so surprised to see this happening in Accra, a city that has rightly got so much attention recently for being one of the most economically and politically successful capitals in Africa. Indeed I was heartened while I was in Accra, listening to a speech by the President himself, defending the rights of the free press to report fully, accurately and fairly."

Buduong later publicly apologized.

Arguments surrounding controversy 
Many felt that Buduong's contentious views were due to the patriarchy prevalent in many societies today, especially in Ghana.

Amanpor also interviewed a Ghanaian man on the same topic on which she interviewed Buduong. He voiced the fact that he has been faithful to his partner because of his meager financial status, adding on that unlike him, people who are financially stable can afford numerous partners. However, he did not receive any backlash for his opinions. Many felt that this was a double standard, as they feel more comfortable with such opinions when they came from men, as opposed to when they are from women.

Charity works 
Under her Moesha Foundation, she spent her 29th birthday with students of the Billaw Basic School in the Upper East Region, where her hometown is located. She donated school bags, books and other relevant learning materials.

References

 http://www.pulse.com.gh/bio/moesha-boduong-id4984861.html
 http://www.pulse.com.gh/entertainment/celebrities/ghanaians-actress-18-things-you-should-know-about-moesha-boduong-id7208005.html

1990 births
Living people
Ghanaian actresses
Accra Girls Senior High School alumni